Percy Robert "Phil" May (13 March 1884 – 6 December 1965) was an English cricketer who played first-class cricket from 1902 to 1910, and a final match in 1926.

Life and career
May was born to Henry and Emma May in Chertsey in Surrey, where Henry worked as a butler. A fast bowler, Percy played for London County in 1902 at the age of 18, and occasionally for Surrey. After being privately educated, May went up to Pembroke College, Cambridge in the autumn of 1902. 

He played cricket for the university side from 1903 to 1906, taking part in victories over Oxford University in 1905 and 1906. In 1906 he bowled unchanged throughout both innings to take 7 for 41 and 5 for 25 in Cambridge's 305-run victory over Yorkshire at Fenner's. He opened the bowling for the Gentlemen against the Players later that year, taking seven wickets, more than any other bowler. He finished the season with 75 wickets at an average of 22.76, his most successful season.

He also won a Blue at Cambridge for Association football, and toured the US with the Corinthians in 1906.

He toured New Zealand with MCC in 1906-07, taking 45 wickets in nine first-class matches at 15.97 and forming a powerful pace attack with Johnny Douglas, who took 50 wickets at 13.26. He took 5 for 53 and 5 for 37 in the first victory over Otago (by 232 runs) and 4 for 49 and 4 for 58 in the second victory (by an innings and 95 runs), and played in both matches against New Zealand, taking eight wickets. He wrote an account of the tour based on his diary, titled With the MCC in New Zealand (1907), which a New Zealand reviewer found "a very readable story ... which I was loth to put down ... the 'behind-the-scenes' life of an English amateur cricketer on tour ... makes for good and entertaining reading". Among the New Zealanders there was some question about the legitimacy of his bowling action; Dick Brittenden later described him as "a fast bowler with a peculiar leap just before delivery, and whose action was suspect".

He played a few matches in 1907, with one outstanding performance for Gentlemen of the South against Players of the South at the Hastings Festival, when he took 8 for 49 and 3 for 69 in a 233-run victory. After that he took a job as a teacher in England and played little first-class cricket.

May spent the years from 1910 to 1950 in Ceylon, managing the 2500-acre Dalkeith rubber plantation at Latpandura in the Kalutara District. He was a regular club cricketer for most of his time in Ceylon, and played in the annual match for Europeans against Ceylonese in 1911, 1912 and 1914. After suffering a shoulder injury not long after he arrived in Ceylon he was forced to abandon fast bowling and instead became a skilful underarm spin bowler and batsman. He served briefly as President of the Ceylon Cricket Association.

May married Ursula Loughnan in 1913. After they returned from Ceylon they retired to Alverstoke in Hampshire. He died in hospital at Eastleigh in December 1965.

References

External links
 Percy May at CricketArchive
 Percy May at Cricinfo

1884 births
1965 deaths
English cricketers
London County cricketers
Surrey cricketers
Alumni of Pembroke College, Cambridge
Cambridge University cricketers
Gentlemen cricketers
Gentlemen of England cricketers
Marylebone Cricket Club cricketers
Gentlemen of the South cricketers
Free Foresters cricketers
Sportspeople from Chertsey